William Travers may refer to:

 William Travers (New Zealand politician) (1819–1903), New Zealand lawyer, politician, explorer, and naturalist
 William Travers (Virginia politician) (1630–1679), Virginia colonial politician, Speaker of the Virginia House of Burgesses
 William Travers, Wales and British Lions rugby union player known as Bunner Travers
 William R. Travers (1819–1887), American lawyer and investor
 Bill Travers (1922–1994), English actor, screenwriter, director and animal rights activist
 Bill Travers (baseball) (born 1952), American baseball pitcher

See also
 Sir William Henry St Laurence Clarke-Travers, 2nd Baronet (1801–1877) of the Clarke-Travers baronets
 William Travers Jerome (1859–1934), American lawyer and politician from New York